Shock 'Em Dead, also known as Rock ‘Em Dead, is a 1991 comedic horror film written by Mark Freed, David Tedder and Andrew Cross, and directed by Mark Freed. It stars Stephen Quadros and Traci Lords in one of her first post-adult film roles. The film is a thriller with a music comedy twist, a self-aware take on metal guitarists from the 1980s, and is also notable for featuring Nitro guitarist Michael Angelo Batio as a guitar double. It was Aldo Ray's last film.

Synopsis
Angel Martin (Stephen Quadros) has just made the deal of a lifetime. Fame, fortune and beautiful women will all be his - for a price. To become a rock star Martin must give his soul, and to survive he must feed on the souls of others. But Angel wants to possess more than just the soul of the woman of his dreams.

Lindsay Roberts (Traci Lords) is the manager of a rising rock band that has a talented new band member. When Angel Martin joined the band she suddenly had her hands full with concerts, contracts—and private meetings with Angel. But success isn't the only new thing in her life: their recent concerts have been marred by a series of brutal killings, which remain unsolved. As Angel lures Lindsay further into his dark mysterious world, the lines are drawn for a terrifying black magic battle against the ultimate evil.

Full Cast 
 Stephen Quadros as Angel Martin
 Michael Angelo Batio as Angel Martin Guitar Double
 Traci Lords as Lindsay Roberts
 Troy Donahue as Record Executive
 Aldo Ray as Tony, The Pizza Shop Owner
 Tim Moffett as Greg
 Jerico DeAngelo as Jake (as Anthony Christian)
 Markus Grupa as Jonny
 Karen Russell as Michelle
 Gina Parks as Marilyn
 Laurel Wiley as Monique
 Tyger Sodipe as Voodoo Woman
 Christopher Maleki as Dustin
 David Homb as Izzy
 Madison Monk as Jimmi Wolf
 Yankee Sulivan as Trailer Manager
 Barne Subaski as Record Executive #2
 Miyako Kirksey as Pizza Girl #1
 Kathleen Kane as Pizza Girl # 2
 Phillip Irwin Cooper as Pizza Boy
 Danny Spear as Officer Corbett
 Mark Richardson as Devin
 Pete Knight as Lead Guitarist #1
 Daniel Sidlow as Lead Guitarist #2
 Ross Hamilton as Peter
 Scott L. Schwartz as Guard
 Dina C. Scott as Groupie #1
 Jackie Moen as Groupie #2
 Jason Adelman as Kid
 Dave Tedder as Cashier
 Frank Callagher as Production Manager
 John Minton as Officer Meak
 Mitch Ford as Officer Reed
 Jan Washburn as Officer Schmidt
 Debra Cross as Receptionist
 Tyler Bowe as Announcer
 Tim Yasui as Spectator
 Richard Strahle as "Porky"

Musicians 
 Rick Livingstone - Lead Vocals
 Michael Angelo Batio - Lead Guitar
 David Celentano - Lead Guitar
 Robert Decker - Producer, Songwriter
 Mark Freed - Songwriter

Production 
The band music and guitar solos were pre-recorded except for the final concert scene in which Michael performed live on film. Supplementary solos were pre-recorded and performed live on film by David Celentano. The band cues (except for Purple Haze) were written by Mark Freed and Robert Decker. There was no back-up guitar on the recorded tracks or rhythm guitarist in the film. The lead vocalist on the band tracks is Rick Livingston.

Michael Angelo Batio's participation 

Director Mark Freed recalled: "When we finished writing the script, it was obvious that the movie was going to need more than just an average guitar player to emulate the role of Angel Martin. This ‘character double’ needed to be a heavy metal, highly skillful guitar player with a dynamic stage presence. The producers and myself agreed that the best man for the job would be Michael Angelo Batio. Two years earlier, I produced Michael in a Star Licks Productions instructional guitar video – hence, I knew of his incredible style and technique". "I called Michael to see if he'd be interested in reading the script; he said his schedule was busy but he’d make time for it. Soon afterwards, he said he’d love to get involved – e.g., doubling the guitar shots on film, playing the role of the demon in Martin's dream sequence and overdubbing the guitar tracks for the film’s concert scenes in advance of principal photography". "Many fans have asked me if Michael's guitar parts were sped up in the film. The answer is no, what you see in the film is in fact Michael playing with no special effects".

Producer Robert Decker also recalled: "I recorded the band tracks in my Santa Monica studio utilizing a Korg 01/W workstation, Emax 8-bit sampler, and a Roland R-8 rhythm composer – recorded on a Otari MX one-inch 16-track". "For the session, Michael showed up with a Dean, twin-necked guitar, which I plugged into a Rockman then direct into the board. Preferring a bit more distortion, I patched in a stomp box that Michael brought as well. I don’t believe that he had heard the band tracks prior to the session – so, as a result, Michael took time to work out the main solo and harmony on a single-neck but would refer to the double-neck to verify that the two parts could be performed in a dual-necked fashion. In our quest to get precision solos in one short studio evening, Michael performed his parts on a single-neck for instant accuracy. Overdubs were added for a fatter sound".

References

External links 
 
 
 "Shock 'Em Dead" at the VARIETY Magazine Television Reviews - Google Books

1990 horror films
American supernatural horror films
American comedy horror films
1990 films
Heavy metal films
1990s English-language films
1990s American films